Creepy Crawlies was a stop motion animation series created by Cosgrove Hall. The series consisted of 52 ten-minute episodes, which were broadcast on Children's ITV between 1987 and 1989. All episodes were written by Peter Reeves and directed by Franc Vose and Brian Little; narration and character voices were provided by Paul Nicholas.

Overview
The series was based upon the daily goings-on of a group of common invertebrate creatures that lived at the bottom of a garden around an old sundial.

Characters
 Mr Harrison the snail
 Suppose the worm
 Ariadne the spider
 Anorak the pillbug (woodlouse)
 Ladybird the ladybird
 Lambeth the beetle
 Ancient the caterpillar

VHS releases
The Video Collection and Thames Video released 2 VHS tapes containing 5 episodes each.

References

External links
 

1987 British television series debuts
1989 British television series endings
1980s British children's television series
Animated television series about insects
British children's animated television shows
ITV children's television shows
British stop-motion animated television series
Television series by FremantleMedia Kids & Family
Television shows produced by Thames Television
English-language television shows
1980s British animated television series
Television series by Cosgrove Hall Films